Miguel Ángel Tena García (born 17 January 1982) is a Spanish retired footballer who played as a central defender, currently a manager.

Club career
Born in Almassora, Province of Castellón, Tena joined up-and-coming Villarreal CF in 2003 from neighbouring Valencia CF, after finishing his football development with the latter and following a failed transfer to Real Madrid Castilla. He made his professional – and La Liga – debut in the 2003–04 season, but would only appear in one league match with his new club, being replaced at the hour-mark of a 2–1 away loss against CA Osasuna.

Subsequently, Tena resumed his career in the Segunda División, with Racing de Ferrol, Polideportivo Ejido (three years), Levante UD, Elche CF, Córdoba CF and CD Lugo, playing 242 games at that level over one decade.

Managerial statistics

References

External links

1982 births
Living people
People from Plana Alta
Sportspeople from the Province of Castellón
Spanish footballers
Footballers from the Valencian Community
Association football defenders
La Liga players
Segunda División players
Segunda División B players
Valencia CF Mestalla footballers
Villarreal CF B players
Villarreal CF players
Racing de Ferrol footballers
Polideportivo Ejido footballers
Levante UD footballers
Elche CF players
Córdoba CF players
CD Lugo players
Cádiz CF players
Spanish football managers
Segunda División B managers
Tercera División managers
Racing de Ferrol managers